Miguel Andrés Escalona Armijo (born 23 March 1990) is a Chilean footballer that currently plays for Deportes Melipilla in the Primera B de Chile.

Honours

Player
Palestino
 Primera División de Chile (1): Runner-up 2008 Clausura

Cobresal
 Primera División de Chile (1): 2015 Clausura

External links
 
 

1990 births
Living people
Chilean footballers
Chilean Primera División players
Club Deportivo Palestino footballers
Cobresal footballers
Association football midfielders